Bohringer, Böhringer, or Boehringer is a surname of German origin. The name probably derives from the toponymic Böhringen, found mainly in Baden-Württemberg. 

Notable people with the surname include:

Richard Bohringer (born 1942), French actor
Romane Bohringer (born 1973), French actress, film director, screenwriter and costume designer
 Moritz Böhringer (born 1993), German American football player for the Schwäbisch Hall Unicorns and Minnesota Vikings

See also
Boehringer (disambiguation)

German-language surnames